USS Gyatt (DD-712/DDG-1), was a  in the United States Navy, named for U.S. Marine Corps Private Edward E. Gyatt, a Marine Raider killed in the Battle of Guadalcanal.

Namesake
Edward Earl Gyatt was born on 4 September 1921 in Syracuse, New York. He enlisted in the United States Marine Corps on 28 January 1942. Private Gyatt was serving with the 1st Marine Raider Battalion during the Battle of Tulagi, part of the initial landings of the Guadalcanal campaign. Part of the invasion force that went ashore on Tulagi on 7 August 1942, Gyatt reported the approach of a Japanese counterattack force on his advanced position that night, he remained at his post and inflicted heavy damage on the enemy until he was killed by a hand grenade. Gyatt was posthumously awarded the Silver Star. The destroyer escort USS Gyatt (DE-550) was named for him but construction was cancelled in 1944 before it could be completed.

Service history
Gyatt  was built by Federal Shipbuilding and Drydock Company in Kearny, New Jersey and sponsored by Mrs. Hilda Morrell, Private Gyatt's mother, who was a member of the gold star mothers.

Commissioning and training exercises 
After shakedown in the Caribbean, Gyatt reported to Norfolk, Virginia for a variety of duties along the East Coast. In addition to local operations and training exercises, she participated in training operations with aircraft carriers in the Gulf of Mexico and the Caribbean. Departing Norfolk on 24 January 1947, Gyatt sailed south to represent the United States at the inauguration of the new Uruguayan President Berres at Montevideo from 27 February 1947 to 6 March 1947.  Before returning to Norfolk on 21 March 1947, she made goodwill visits to Rio de Janeiro and Port of Spain, Trinidad.

Operations 

Gyatt sailed 20 November 1947 to deploy with the 6th Fleet in the Mediterranean and returned to Norfolk on 2 March 1948.  She participated in six subsequent deployments to Northern Europe and the Mediterranean. Other operations took her north from Norfolk to Nova Scotia and Iceland and south into the Caribbean Sea.

Guided missile destroyer conversion 

Gyatt entered the Boston Naval Shipyard on 26 September 1955, and decommissioned on 31 October for conversion into the world's first guided missile destroyer. In addition to twin Terrier guided missile launchers, she received the Navy's first Denny-Brown stabilization system with two 45 square foot (4 m²) retractable fins extending out from midships well below the waterline to greatly reduce pitch and roll on the sea). Her hull classification was changed to DDG-712 on 1 December 1956. Gyatt recommissioned two days later.

The new guided missile ship spent nearly three years doing intensive evaluation and development work along the Atlantic coast. On 23 May 1957 her hull number was changed to DDG-1 in recognition of her pioneering position. She sailed to join the 6th Fleet on 28 January 1960 and was the first guided missile destroyer to deploy with an overseas fleet. By the time of her arrival back in Charleston, her new home port on 31 August 1960, Gyatt had participated in fleet readiness and training operations throughout the Mediterranean.

Space program 

On her return, Gyatt joined in America's space program.  Taking nose-cone recovery station from 5–10 November 1960 and from 24–26 April 1961 to aid in Project Mercury, she pioneered another area of expanding seapower.  With another world crisis pending over the status of Berlin, she again sailed 3 August 1961 to bolster the 6th Fleet in the Mediterranean.  She remained on alert posture with the "steel gray stabilizers" in the Mediterranean until 3 March 1962, then resumed training along the eastern seaboard out of Charleston, South Carolina.

Overhaul 

Gyatt entered the Charleston Naval Shipyard on 29 June 1962, for an overhaul that included the removal of her missile system and installation of newly developed equipment that prepared her for specialized service with the Operational Test and Evaluation Force. Her classification changed from guided missile destroyer DDG-1 back to conventional destroyer DD-712 on 1 October 1962. Her preparations were complete by 1 January 1963 when Gyatt arrived in Norfolk for continuing experimental work under the Operational Test and Evaluation Force commanded by Captain Chester "Chet" M. Lee from 1963 to 1964, which extended into the Caribbean Sea. Gyatt continued to operate along the Atlantic coast and in the Caribbean into 1967. She performed patrol and ASW duty and trained the officers and men of the Navy in guided missile destroyer tactics. She was especially active in testing and evaluating new equipment and helping to improve the efficiency and modernity of the Navy.

Sinking 

Gyatt was transferred to the Select Reserve and switched homeports to Washington, D.C. in 1968. After being stricken on 22 October 1969, Gyatt was sunk as a target off Virginia on 11 June 1970.

References

External links
 Gyatt Association
 

 

World War II destroyers of the United States
Cold War destroyers of the United States
Ships built in Kearny, New Jersey
1945 ships
Ships sunk as targets
Shipwrecks of the Virginia coast
Gearing-class destroyers of the United States Navy
Maritime incidents in 1970